Chitral is a town in the North West Frontier Province of Pakistan.

Chitral may also refer to:
 Chitral District, an administrative area of North West Frontier, Pakistan
 Chitral Tehsil, a subdivision of Chitral District
 Chitral Airport
 Chitral National Park in Chitral District
 State of Chitral, the former princely state in the area of Chitral District
 Kunar River or Chitral River, a river in Afghanistan and Pakistan
 Kunar Valley or Chitral Valley
 Chitral Expedition, an 1895 British military expedition to relieve the Siege of Chitral
  or Jadotville, a cargo and passenger liner built for Compagnie Maritime Belge

See also
 Khowar (Chitrali) language
 Languages of Chitral